The Trinidad and Tobago national netball team, known as the Calypso Girls, represent Trinidad and Tobago in international netball. The Caribbean team competed at the first World Netball Championships in 1963, and are the only nation outside of Australia and New Zealand to have won a World Championship (in 1979). Throughout the mid-1970s and 1980s the Calypso Girls were a dominant force in international netball, but since the early 1990s the team have become less competitive.

Players

2019 Calypso Girls Netball World Cup Team

Competitive history

See also
 Netball in Trinidad and Tobago

References

National netball teams of the Americas
Netball in Trinidad and Tobago
Netball